Mitchell Price is a former professional American football player who played defensive back for the Cincinnati Bengals, Arizona Cardinals, and Los Angeles Rams

References

1967 births
Players of American football from Jacksonville, Florida
American football safeties
Tulane Green Wave football players
SMU Mustangs football players
Cincinnati Bengals players
Arizona Cardinals players
Los Angeles Rams players
Living people